Esfahanak-e Moshai (also Romanized as Eşfahānak-e Moshā‘ī and Eşfahānak Mashā‘ī; also known as Esfahanak) is a village in Chenarud-e Shomali Rural District, Chenarud District, Chadegan County, Isfahan Province, Iran. At the 2006 census, its population was 155, in 29 families.

References 

Populated places in Chadegan County